The Indo-US civilian nuclear agreement was met with stiff opposition by some political parties and activists in India. Although many mainstream political parties including the Indian National Congress support the deal along with regional parties like Dravida Munnetra Kazhagam and Rashtriya Janata Dal its realisation has run into difficulties in the face of stiff political opposition in India. Also, in November 2007, former Indian Military chiefs, bureaucrats and scientists drafted a letter to Members of Parliament expressing their support for the deal. However, opposition and criticism continued at political levels. The Samajwadi Party (SP) which was with the Left Front in opposing the deal changed its stand after discussing with ex-president of India and scientist Dr A P J Abdul Kalam. Now the SP is in support of the government and the deal. The Indian Government survived a vote of confidence by 275-256 after the Left Front withdrew their support to the government over this dispute.

Political opposition

Bharatiya Janata Party 
The main opposition party Bharatiya Janata Party (BJP) which laid the groundwork for the deal criticized the deal saying that the deal in its present form was unacceptable to the BJP and wanted the deal renegotiated. The BJP had asked the government not to accept the deal without a vote in the parliament. However, the government remained steadfast on its commitment to the deal and has refused to back down on the agreement. Veteran BJP leader Lal Krishna Advani, in a statement to the Indian Express newspaper, seemed to indicate willingness to support the government provided some legislative measures. However his party refused to follow that line and stuck to its earlier stand.

Supply of uranium and testing-bans
IBN reported:

Left Front 
The primary opposition to the nuclear deal in India, however, comes from the Communist Party of India (Marxist) (CPI(M))and its parliamentary allies (Communist Party of India, Revolutionary Socialist Party (India), All India Forward Bloc) November 17 the left parties had provisionally agreed to let the government initiate talks with the IAEA for India specific safeguards which indicated that they may support.  The CPI(M), an external parliamentary supporter of government as it stipulates conditions that in some areas are more severe than the clauses in either the NPT or the CTBT. They alleged that the deal would undermine the sovereignty of India's foreign policy and also claimed that the Indian government was hiding certain clauses of the deal, which would harm India's indigenous nuclear program, from the media. On July 9, 2008, the Left Front withdrew support to the government reducing its strength to 276 in the Lok Sabha (the lower house of the parliament). The government survived a confidence vote in the parliament on July 22, 2008 by 275-256 votes in the backdrop of defections from both camps to the opposite camps.

United Nationalist Progressive Alliance (UNPA)
The United Nationalist Progressive Alliance (UNPA) was divided over support of the nuclear deal. While the Samajwadi Party supported it after consultations with Abdul Kalam, the other members of the UNPA led by the Telugu Desam Party (TDP) opposed it saying that the deal is against India's interest. The SP was eventually suspended from the UNPA.

Bahujan Samaj Party

The Bahujan Samaj Party (BSP) also opposed the nuclear deal, saying that it was anti-Muslim. The party joined hands with the Left Front and the TDP in voting against the government in Parliament on the nuclear deal.

Others 
In 2006, some Indian ex-nuclear scientists had written an appeal to Indian Members of Parliament to ensure that "decisions taken today do not inhibit India's future ability to develop and pursue nuclear technologies for the benefit of the nation".

Various Indian political and scientific personalities have repeatedly expressed concerns that the United States may use the India-US civilian nuclear agreement as a diplomatic weapon if Indian foreign policy was not in conformity with geopolitical interests of the US.

See also
2008 Lok Sabha Vote of Confidence

References

Nuclear technology in India
Political controversies in India
India–United States relations